David L. Berkowitz (born November 23, 1949) is an American professional contract bridge player. He is from Old Tappan, New Jersey.

In 1998, he came as close as it is possible to come to a world championship without winning it. In the World Open Pairs, he and Larry Cohen led throughout the five-session final, only to be overtaken on the last two boards. He also earned a bronze medal at the 2000 World Team Olympiad in Maastricht, Netherlands. He was inducted into the ACBL Hall of Fame in 2010.

Berkowitz whose wife, Lisa, is a former women's world champion, often comments, "I am not even the best player in my own house." They reside in Boca Raton, Florida. Their daughter Dana and son Michael play bridge as well.

Bridge accomplishments

Honors

 ACBL Hall of Fame, 2010

Awards
 Mott-Smith Trophy (Spring NABC) 1982
 Fishbein Trophy (Summer NABC) 2011, 2018
 Herman Trophy (Fall NABC) 1991
 Digital Fountain Award (Best Played Hand of the Year) 2001
 Romex Award (Best Bid Hand of the Year) 1995, 2000
 Precision Award (Best Defended Hand of the Year) 1996

Wins
 North American Bridge Championships (31)
 von Zedtwitz Life Master Pairs (2) 1987, 1996 
 Rockwell Mixed Pairs (2) 1986, 1987 
 Silodor Open Pairs (3) 2004, 2006, 2009 
 Wernher Open Pairs (2) 1982, 1996 
 Blue Ribbon Pairs (2) 1978, 1995 
 North American Pairs (1) 1995 
 Grand National Teams (8) 1994, 2007, 2008, 2011, 2012, 2013, 2015, 2018 
 Roth Open Swiss Teams (1) 2011 
 Vanderbilt (1) 2005 
 Keohane North American Swiss Teams (1) 1999 
 Mitchell Board-a-Match Teams (3) 1982, 1991, 2007 
 Chicago Mixed Board-a-Match (4) 1986, 1993, 1995, 1998 
 Reisinger (1) 1991 
 United States Bridge Championships (1)
 Open Team Trials (1) 2000
 Other notable wins:
 Buffett Cup (1) 2006
 Cavendish Invitational Teams (3) 1983, 1985, 1994
 Pan American Open Teams (1) 1992
 Reisinger Knockout Teams (2) 1990, 2001
 Cap Gemini World Top Invitational Pairs (1) 1999
 Cavendish Invitational Individual (1) 1981

Runners-up
 World Open Pairs (1) 1998
 North American Bridge Championships (26)
 Vanderbilt (7) 1979, 1984, 1988, 1990, 1993, 1998, 2004
 Spingold (4) 1976, 2009, 2010, 2018
 Reisinger (4) 1987, 2002, 2004, 2007
 Open Board-a-Match Teams (1) 2008
 Men's Board-a-Match Teams (1) 1989
 North American Swiss Teams (2) 2006, 2022
 Mixed Board-a-Match Teams (1) 2011
 Blue Ribbon Pairs (2) 1976, 1996
 Life Master Open Pairs (1) 1991
 Open Pairs (2) 1983, 1985
 Open Pairs I (1) 2002
 United States Bridge Championships (5)
 Open Team Trials (5) 1987, 1989, 1998, 2002, 2008
 Other notable 2nd places:
 Buffett Cup (1) 2008
 Cavendish Invitational Teams (1) 2000
 Reisinger Knockout Teams (2) 1973, 1981
 Cavendish Invitational Pairs (1) 1983
 Cavendish Invitational Individual (1) 1980

References

External links
  – with video interview
 
 David Berkowitz profile at United States Bridge Federation
 BERKOWITZ David athlete information at the 1st SportAccord World Mind Games (2011)
 ACBL Hall of Fame induction audio-video recordings at YouTube: presentation by Larry Cohen (8:40) and acceptance by Berkowitz (6:00), both uploaded July 24, 2010, by Cohen

1949 births
American contract bridge players
Living people
People from Old Tappan, New Jersey
Place of birth missing (living people)